Different Cars and Trains is a 2003 EP from German electronica band The Notwist.

Track listing
"Neon Golden (Console Remix)" (Markus Acher, Michael Archer, Martin Gretschmann) - 4:46
"Pilot (Console Remix)" (Acher, Archer, Gretschmann) - 4:55
"Red Room" (Acher, Gretschmann) - 6:11
"This Room (Four Tet and Manitoba Remix)" (Archer, Archer, Gretschmann, Martin Messerschmid) - 8:06
"Different Cars and Trains (Loopspool Version)" (Acher, Archer, Andreas Gerth) - 5:50

Personnel 

 Markus Acher - guitar, vocals
 Michael Acher - bass
 Martin Gretschmann (aka Console) - programming
 Martin Messerschmidt - drums

References

The Notwist albums
2003 EPs